Srđan Babić (born 22 April 1996) is a Serbian professional footballer who plays as a defender for Spanish club Almería.

Club career

Vojvodina
Babić started out at his hometown club Borac Banja Luka, before joining the youth system of Vojvodina in August 2011. He made his first team debut under manager Branko Babić on 1 March 2014, playing the full 90 minutes in a 2–0 home win over Voždovac. Despite making only eight league appearances in the 2013–14 season, Babić was named in the competition's best eleven. He also helped his team win the Serbian Cup, scoring a goal in a 2–0 victory over Jagodina in the final. In the 2014–15 season, Babić was a regular choice at centre-back, making 27 appearances in all competitions.

Real Sociedad
On 8 July 2015, Babić signed a four-year contract with Spanish side Real Sociedad, being assigned to the reserves in Segunda División B. He was an undisputed starter during the 2015–16 campaign, making 31 appearances and scoring three goals.

Reus (loan)
On 31 August 2016, Babić was loaned to Segunda División club Reus Deportiu, on a season-long loan. A backup option to Pichu Atienza and Jesús Olmo, he featured in eleven matches, and also scored his first professional goal while at the club, netting his team's only in a 1–2 home loss against Córdoba on 4 December.

Red Star Belgrade
On 7 July 2017, Babić made a one-year loan deal with Serbian SuperLiga club Red Star Belgrade. In the mid-season of the 2017–18 campaign, Red Star purchased his contract and Babić signed with the club permanently for a fee of €800,000. On 9 February 2018, Babić signed a new four-year contract with Red Star Belgrade. Babić scored his first goal for Red Star in 5–2 away victory over Mladost Lučani on 1 April 2018, on Slavoljub Srnić's assist from corner kick. On 12 August 2018, Babić scored in 3–0 home win against Spartak Subotica.

Almería
On 30 August 2021, Babić returned to Spain after agreeing to a one-year loan deal with UD Almería in the second division. The following 5 June, after contributing with the club's promotion to La Liga as champions, he signed a permanent contract until 2026.

International career
Babić represented Serbia at the 2014 UEFA Under-19 Championship, as the team was eliminated in the semi-final by Portugal. He was also a regular member of the team that won the 2015 FIFA U-20 World Cup.

In November 2022, he was selected in Serbia's squad for the 2022 FIFA World Cup in Qatar. He played in a group stage match against Cameroon, coming on as a sub in 78th minute, replacing Miloš Veljković.

Statistics

International

Honours

Club
Vojvodina
 Serbian Cup: 2013–14

Red Star Belgrade
 Serbian SuperLiga: 2017–18, 2018–19, 2019–20

Almería
 Segunda División: 2021–22

International
Serbia
 FIFA U-20 World Cup New Zealand: 2015

Individual
 Serbian SuperLiga Team of the Season: 2013–14
Orders
 Medal of Merit (Republika Srpska)

Notes

References

External links
 
 
 

Association football defenders
Serbs of Bosnia and Herzegovina
CF Reus Deportiu players
Expatriate footballers in Portugal
Expatriate footballers in Spain
F.C. Famalicão players
FK Vojvodina players
Primeira Liga players
Real Sociedad B footballers
Segunda División players
Segunda División B players
Red Star Belgrade footballers
UD Almería players
Serbia under-21 international footballers
Serbia youth international footballers
Serbian expatriate footballers
Serbian expatriate sportspeople in Spain
Serbian expatriate sportspeople in Portugal
Serbian SuperLiga players
Sportspeople from Banja Luka
1996 births
Living people
Serbian footballers
Serbia international footballers
2022 FIFA World Cup players